Soviet dissidents were people who disagreed with certain features of Soviet ideology or with its entirety and who were willing to speak out against them. The term dissident was used in the Soviet Union in the period from the mid-1960s until the fall of communism. It was used to refer to small groups of marginalized intellectuals whose challenges, from modest to radical to the Soviet regime, met protection and encouragement from correspondents and typically criminal prosecution or other forms of silencing by the authorities. Following the etymology of the term, a dissident is considered to "sit apart" from the regime. As dissenters began self-identifying as dissidents, the term came to refer to an individual whose non-conformism was perceived to be for the good of a society. The most influential subset of the dissidents is known as the Soviet human rights movement.

Political opposition in the USSR was barely visible and, with rare exceptions, of little consequence, primarily because it was instantly crushed with brute force. Instead, an important element of dissident activity in the Soviet Union was informing society (both inside the Soviet Union and in foreign countries) about violation of laws and human rights and organizing in defense of those rights. Over time, the dissident movement created vivid awareness of Soviet Communist abuses.

Soviet dissidents who criticized the state in most cases faced legal sanctions under the Soviet Criminal Code and the choice between exile abroad (with revocation of their Soviet citizenship), the mental hospital, or the labor camp. Anti-Soviet political behavior, in particular, being outspoken in opposition to the authorities, demonstrating for reform, writing books critical of the USSR were defined in some persons as being simultaneously a criminal act (e.g., violation of Articles 70 or 190-1), a symptom (e.g., "delusion of reformism"), and a diagnosis (e.g., "sluggish schizophrenia").

The 1950s–1960s
In the 1950s, Soviet dissidents started leaking criticism to the West by sending documents and statements to foreign diplomatic missions in Moscow. In the 1960s, Soviet dissidents frequently declared that the rights the government of the Soviet Union denied them were universal rights, possessed by everyone regardless of race, religion and nationality. In August 1969, for instance, the Initiating Group for Defense of Civil Rights in the USSR appealed to the United Nations Committee on Human Rights to defend the human rights being trampled on by Soviet authorities in a number of trials.

Some of the major milestones of the dissident movement of the 1960s included:

 Public readings of poetry at the Mayakovsky Square in downtown Moscow, where some of the underground writings critical of the system were often circulated; some of these public readings were dispersed by the police;
 The trial of poet Iosif Brodsky (later known as Joseph Brodsky, the future winner of the Nobel Prize in Literature) who was charged with 'parasitism' for not being officially employed and sentenced in 1963 to internal exile; he gained widespread sympathy and support in dissident and semi-dissident circles, mostly through the notes from his trial compiled by Frida Vigdorova
 The trial and sentencing of writers Andrei Sinyavsky and Yuli Daniel who were arrested in 1965 for publishing their co-authored work abroad under pennames and sentenced to labor camp and internal exile; opposition to this trial led to a campaign of petitions for their release that was signed by thousands of people, many of whom went on to participate more actively in the dissident movement
 Silent demonstrations on Moscow's Pushkin Square initiated by Alexander Yesenin-Volpin on the Soviet Constitution Day of Dec. 5, 1965, with posters urging the authorities to observe their own Constitution
 Petitioning campaigns against the downplaying of Stalin's terror after the removal of Nikita Khrushchev and the resurgence of the cult of Stalin's personality in parts of the Soviet government bureaucracy
 The launch, in April 1968, of the underground periodical, 'Chronicle of Current Events', documenting violations of human rights and protest activities across the Soviet Union
 The publication in the West of Andrei Sakharov's first political essay 'Reflections on Progress and Intellectual Freedom' in the spring and summer of 1968
 The rally of protest against the Soviet invasion of Czechoslovakia to suppress 'the Prague Spring'; was held on August 25, 1968 on Moscow's Red Square by eight dissidents including Viktor Fainberg, Natalya Gorbanevskaya, Pavel Litvinov, Vladimir Dremlyuga, and others
 The founding of the Initiative on Human Rights in 1969

The 1970s

Our history shows that most of the people can be fooled for a very long time. But now all this idiocy is coming into clear contradiction with the fact that we have some level of openness. (Vladimir Voinovich)

The heyday of the dissenters as a presence in the Western public life was the 1970s. The Helsinki Accords inspired dissidents in the Soviet Union, Czechoslovakia, Hungary, and Poland to openly protest human rights failures by their own governments. The Soviet dissidents demanded that the Soviet authorities implement their own commitments proceeding from the Helsinki Agreement with the same zeal and in the same way as formerly the outspoken legalists expected the Soviet authorities to adhere strictly to the letter of their constitution. Dissident Russian and East European intellectuals who urged compliance with the Helsinki accords have been subjected to official repression. According to Soviet dissident Leonid Plyushch, Moscow has taken advantage of the Helsinki security pact to improve its economy while increasing the suppression of political dissenters. 50 members of Soviet Helsinki Groups were imprisoned. Cases of political prisoners and prisoners of conscience in the Soviet Union were divulged by Amnesty International in 1975 and by The Committee for the Defense of Soviet Political Prisoners in 1975 and 1976.

US President Jimmy Carter in his inaugural address on 20 January 1977 announced that human rights would be central to foreign policy during his administration. In February, Carter sent Andrei Dmitrievich Sakharov a letter expressing his support for the latter's stance on human rights. In the wake of Carter's letter to Sakharov, the USSR cautioned against attempts "to interfere' in its affairs under "a thought-up pretext of 'defending human rights.'" Because of Carter's open show of support for Soviet dissidents, the KGB was able to link dissent with American imperialism through suggesting that such protest is a cover for American espionage in the Soviet Union. The KGB head Yuri Andropov determined, "The need has thus emerged to terminate the actions of Orlov, fellow Helsinki monitor Ginzburg and others once and for all, on the basis of existing law." According to Dmitri Volkogonov and Harold Shukman, it was Andropov who approved the numerous trials of human rights activists such as Andrei Amalrik, Vladimir Bukovsky, Vyacheslav Chornovil, Zviad Gamsakhurdia, Alexander Ginzburg, Natalya Gorbanevskaya, Pyotr Grigorenko, Anatoly Shcharansky, and others.

If we accept human rights violations as just "their way" of doing things, then we are all guilty. (Andrei Sakharov)

Voluntary and involuntary emigration allowed the authorities to rid themselves of many political active intellectuals including writers Valentin Turchin, Georgi Vladimov, Vladimir Voinovich, Lev Kopelev, Vladimir Maximov, Naum Korzhavin, Vasily Aksyonov, psychiatrist Marina Voikhanskaya and others. A Chronicle of Current Events covered 424 political trials, in which 753 people were convicted, and no one of the accused was acquitted; in addition, 164 people were declared insane and sent to compulsory treatment in a psychiatric hospital.

According to Soviet dissidents and Western critics, the KGB had routinely sent dissenters to psychiatrists for diagnosing to avoid embarrassing public trials and to discredit dissidence as the product of ill minds. On the grounds that political dissenters in the Soviet Union were psychotic and deluded, they were locked away in psychiatric hospitals and treated with neuroleptics. Confinement of political dissenters in psychiatric institutions had become a common practice. That technique could be called the "medicalization" of dissidence or psychiatric terror, the now familiar form of repression applied in the Soviet Union to Leonid Plyushch, Pyotr Grigorenko, and many others. Finally, many persons at that time tended to believe that dissidents were abnormal people whose commitment to mental hospitals was quite justified. In the opinion of the Moscow Helsinki Group chairwoman Lyudmila Alexeyeva, the attribution of a mental illness to a prominent figure who came out with a political declaration or action is the most significant factor in the assessment of psychiatry during the 1960–1980s. At that time Soviet dissident Vladimir Bukovsky wrote A New Mental Illness in the USSR: The Opposition published in French, German, Italian, Spanish and (coauthored with Semyon Gluzman) A Manual on Psychiatry for Dissidents published in Russian, English, French, Italian, German, Danish.

Repression of the Helsinki Watch Groups

In 1977-1979 and again in 1980-1982, the KGB reacted to the Helsinki Watch Groups in Moscow, Kiev, Vilnius, Tbilisi, and Erevan by launching large-scale arrests and sentencing its members to in prison, labor camp, internal exile and psychiatric imprisonment.

From the members of the Moscow Helsinki Group, 1978 saw its members Yuri Orlov, Vladimir Slepak and Anatoly Shcharansky sentenced to lengthy labor camp terms and internal exile for "anti-Soviet agitation and propaganda" and treason. Another wave of arrests followed in the early 1980s: Malva Landa, Viktor Nekipelov, Leonard Ternovsky, Feliks Serebrov, Tatiana Osipova, Anatoly Marchenko, and Ivan Kovalev. Soviet authorities offered some activists the "opportunity" to emigrate. Lyudmila Alexeyeva emigrated in 1977. The Moscow Helsinki Group founding members Mikhail Bernshtam, Alexander Korchak, Vitaly Rubin also emigrated, and Pyotr Grigorenko was stripped of his Soviet citizenship while seeking medical treatment abroad.

The Ukrainian Helsinki Group suffered severe repressions throughout 1977-1982, with at times multiple labor camp sentences handed out to Mykola Rudenko, Oleksy Tykhy, Myroslav Marynovych, Mykola Matusevych, Levko Lukyanenko, Oles Berdnyk, Mykola Horbal, Zinovy Krasivsky, Vitaly Kalynychenko, Vyacheslav Chornovil, Olha Heyko, Vasyl Stus, Oksana Meshko, Ivan Sokulsky, Ivan Kandyba, Petro Rozumny, Vasyl Striltsiv, Yaroslav Lesiv, Vasyl Sichko, Yuri Lytvyn, Petro Sichko. By 1983 the Ukrainian Helsinki Group had 37 members, of whom 22 were in prison camps, 5 were in exile, 6 emigrated to the West, 3 were released and were living in Ukraine, 1 (Mykhailo Melnyk) committed suicide.

The Lithuanian Helsinki Group saw its members subjected to two waves of imprisonment for anti-Soviet activities and "organization of religious processions": Viktoras Petkus was sentenced in 1978; others followed in 1980-1981: Algirdas Statkevičius, Vytautas Skuodys, Mečislovas Jurevičius, and Vytautas Vaičiūnas.

Currents of dissidence

Civil and human rights movement 

Starting in the 1960s, the early years of the Brezhnev stagnation, dissidents in the Soviet Union increasingly turned their attention towards civil and eventually human rights concerns. The fight for civil and human rights focused on issues of freedom of expression, freedom of conscience, freedom to emigrate, punitive psychiatry, and the plight of political prisoners. It was characterized by a new openness of dissent, a concern for legality, the rejection of any 'underground' and violent struggle.

Throughout the 1960s-1980s, those active in the civil and human rights movement engaged in a variety of activities: The documentation of political repression and rights violations in samizdat (unsanctioned press); individual and collective protest letters and petitions; unsanctioned demonstrations; mutual aid for prisoners of conscience; and, most prominently, civic watch groups appealing to the international community. Repercussions for these activities ranged from dismissal from work and studies to many years of imprisonment in labor camps and being subjected to punitive psychiatry.

Dissidents active in the movement in the 1960s introduced a "legalist" approach of avoiding moral and political commentary in favor of close attention to legal and procedural issues. Following several landmark political trials, coverage of arrests and trials in samizdat became more common. This activity eventually led to the founding of the Chronicle of Current Events in April 1968. The unofficial newsletter reported violations of civil rights and judicial procedure by the Soviet government and responses to those violations by citizens across the USSR.

During the late 1960s and throughout the 1970s, the rights-based strategy of dissent incorporated human rights ideas and rhetoric. The movement included figures such as Valery Chalidze, Yuri Orlov, and Lyudmila Alexeyeva. Special groups were founded such as the Initiative Group for the Defense of Human Rights in the USSR (1969) and the Committee on Human Rights in the USSR (1970). The signing of the Helsinki Accords (1975) containing human rights clauses provided rights campaigners with a new hope to use international instruments. This led to the creation of dedicated Helsinki Watch Groups in Moscow (Moscow Helsinki Group), Kiev (Ukrainian Helsinki Group), Vilnius (Lithuanian Helsinki Group), Tbilisi, and Erevan (1976–77).

The civil and human rights initiatives played a significant role in providing a common language for Soviet dissidents with varying concerns, and became a common cause for social groups in the dissident milieu ranging from activists in the youth subculture to academics such as Andrei Sakharov. Due to the contacts with Western journalists as well as the political focus during détente (Helsinki Accords), those active in the human rights movement were among those most visible in the West (next to refuseniks).

Movements of deported nations 

Several national or ethnic groups who had been deported under Stalin formed movements to return to their homelands. In particular, the Crimean Tatars aimed to return to Crimea, the Meskhetian Turks to South Georgia and ethnic Germans aimed to resettle along the Volga River near Saratov.

The Crimean Tatar movement takes a prominent place among the movement of deported nations. The Tatars had been refused the right to return to the Crimea, even though the laws justifying their deportation had been overturned. Their first collective letter calling for the restoration dates to 1957. In the early 1960s, the Crimean Tatars had begun to establish initiative groups in the places where they had been forcibly resettled. Led by Mustafa Dzhemilev, they founded their own democratic and decentralized organization, considered unique in the history of independent movements in the Soviet Union.

Emigration movements 
The emigration movements in the Soviet Union included the movement of Soviet Jews to emigrate to Israel and of the Volga Germans to emigrate to West Germany.

Soviet Jews were routinely denied permission to emigrate by the authorities of the former Soviet Union and other countries of the Eastern bloc. A movement for the right to emigrate formed in the 1960s, which also gave rise to a revival of interest in Jewish culture. The refusenik cause gathered considerable attention in the West.

Citizens of German origin who lived in the Baltic states prior to their annexation in 1940 and descendants of the
eighteenth-century Volga German settlers also formed a movement to leave the Soviet Union. In 1972, the West German government entered an agreement with the Soviet authorities which permitted between 6000 and 8000 people to emigrate to West Germany every year for the rest of the decade. As a result, almost 70000 ethnic Germans had left the Soviet Union by the mid-1980s.

Similarly, Armenians achieved a small emigration. By the mid-1980s, over 15000 Armenians had emigrated.

Russia has changed in the recent years largely in the social, economic, and political spheres. Migrations from Russian have become less forceful and primarily a result of free will that is expressed by the individual.

Religious movements 
The religious movements in the USSR included Russian Orthodox, Catholic, and Protestant movements. They focused on the freedom to practice their faith and resistance to interference by the state in their internal affairs.

The Russian Orthodox movement remained relatively small. The Catholic movement in Lithuania was part of the larger Lithuanian national movement. Protestant groups which opposed the anti-religious state directives included the Baptists, the Seventh-day Adventists, and the Pentecostals. Similar to the Jewish and German dissident movements, many in the independent Pentecostal movement pursued emigration.

National movements 
The national movements included the Russian national dissidents as well as dissident movements from Ukraine, Lithuania, Latvia, Estonia, Georgia, and Armenia.

Among the nations that lived in their own territories with the status of republics within the Soviet Union, the first movement to emerge in the 1960s was the Ukrainian movement. Its aspiration was to resist the Russification of Ukraine and to insist on equal rights and democratization for the republic.

In Lithuania, the national movement of the 1970s was closely linked to the Catholic movement.

Literary and cultural 

Several landmark examples of dissenting writers played a significant role for the wider dissident movement. These include the persecutions of Osip Mandelshtam, Boris Pasternak, Mikhail Bulgakov, and Joseph Brodsky, as well as the publication of The Gulag Archipelago by Aleksandr Solzhenitsyn.

In literary world, there were dozens of literati who participated in dissident movement, including Vasily Aksyonov, Arkadiy Belinkov, Leonid Borodin, Joseph Brodsky, Georgi Vladimov, Vladimir Voinovich, Aleksandr Galich, Venedikt Yerofeyev, Alexander Zinoviev, Lev Kopelev, Naum Korzhavin, Vladimir Maximov, Viktor Nekrasov, Andrei Sinyavsky, Aleksandr Solzhenitsyn, and Varlam Shalamov.

In the early Soviet Union, non-conforming academics were exiled via so-called Philosophers' ships. Later, figures such as cultural theorist Grigori Pomerants were among active dissidents.

Other intersections of cultural and literary nonconformism with dissidents include the wide field of Soviet Nonconformist Art, such as the painters of the underground Lianozovo group, and artists active in the "Second Culture".

Other groups 
Other groups included the Socialists, the movements for socioeconomic rights (especially the independent unions), as well as women's, environmental, and peace movements.

Dissidents and the Cold War

Responding to the issue of refuseniks in the Soviet Union, the United States Congress passed the Jackson–Vanik amendment in 1974. The provision in United States federal law intended to affect U.S. trade relations with countries of the Communist bloc that restrict freedom of emigration and other human rights.

The eight member countries of the Warsaw Pact signed the Helsinki Final Act in August 1975. The "third basket" of the Act included extensive human rights clauses.

When Jimmy Carter entered office in 1976, he broadened his advisory circle to include critics of US–Soviet détente. He voiced support for the Czech dissident movement known as Charter 77, and publicly expressed concern about the Soviet treatment of dissidents Aleksandr Ginzburg and Andrei Sakharov. In 1977, Carter received prominent dissident Vladimir Bukovsky in the White House, asserting that he did not intend "to be timid" in his support of human rights.

In 1979, the US Helsinki Watch Committee was established, funded by the Ford Foundation. Founded after the example of the Moscow Helsinki Group and similar watch groups in the Soviet bloc, it also aimed to monitor compliance with the human rights provisions of the Helsinki Accords and to provide moral support for those struggling for that objective inside the Soviet bloc. It acted as a conduit for information on repression in the Soviet Union, and lobbied policy-makers in the United States to continue to press the issue with Soviet leaders.

US President Ronald Reagan attributed to the view that the "brutal treatment of Soviet dissidents was due to bureaucratic inertia." On 14 November 1988, he held a meeting with Andrei Sakharov at the White House and said that Soviet human rights abuses are impeding progress and would continue to do so until the problem is "completely eliminated." Whether talking to about one hundred dissidents in a broadcast to the Soviet people or at the U.S. Embassy, Reagan's agenda was one of freedom to travel, freedom of speech and freedom of religion.

Dissidents about their dissent
Andrei Sakharov said, "Everyone wants to have a job, be married, have children, be happy, but dissidents must be prepared to see their lives destroyed and those dear to them hurt. When I look at my situation and my family's situation and that of my country, I realize that things are getting steadily worse."
Fellow dissident and one of the founders of the Moscow Helsinki Group Lyudmila Alexeyeva wrote:

According to Soviet dissident Victor Davydoff, totalitarian system has no mechanisms that could change the behavior of the ruling group from within. Any attempts to change this are immediately suppressed through repression. Dissidents appealed to international human rights organizations, foreign governments, and there was a result.

See also
 A Chronicle of Current Events
 Anarchism in Russia
 Anti-Leninism
 Anti-Stalinist left
 Chronicle of the Catholic Church in Lithuania
 Dissident movement in the People's Republic of Poland
 Dubravlag
 Human rights movement in the Soviet Union
 Left communism
 Perm-36
 Parallels, Events, People (36 parts) – 2013 documentary by Natella Boltyanskaya
 Refusenik – 2007 documentary by Laura Bialis
 Samizdat
 They Chose Freedom (4 parts) – 2005 documentary by Vladimir Kara-Murza Jr.

References

Further reading

Outsiders' works
 
 
 
 
 
 
 
 
 
 
 
 
 
 
 
 
 
 
 
 
 
 
 
 
 
 
 
 
 
 
 
 
 
 
 
 
 
 
 
 
 
 
 
 
 
 
 
 
 
 
 
 
 
 
 
 
 
 
 
 
 
 
 
 
 
 
 
 
 
 
 
 
 
 
 
 
 
 
 
 
 
 
 
 
 
 
 
 
 
 
 
 
 
 
 
 
 
 
 
 
 
 
 
 
 
 
 
 
 
 
 
 
 
 
 
 
 
 
 
 
 
 
 
 
 
 
 
 
 
 
 
 
 
 
 
 
 
 
 
 
 
 
 
 
 
 
 
 
 
 
 
 
 
 
 
 
 
 
 
 
 
 
 
 
 
 
 
 
 
 
 
 
 
 
 
 
 
 
 
 
 
 
 
 
 
 
 
 
 
 
 
 
 
 
 
 
 
 
 
 
 
 
 
 
 
 
 
 
 
 
 
 
 
 
 
 
 
 
 
 
 
 
 
 
 
 
 
 
 
 
 
 
 
 
 
 
 
 
 
 
 
 
 
 
 
 
 
 
 
 
 
 
 
 
 
 
 
 
 
 
 
 
 
 
 
 
 
 
 
 
 
 
 
 
 
 
 
 
 
 
 
 
Reprinted in

Insiders' works
 
 
 
 
 
 
 
 
 
 
 
 
 
 
 
  The work in Russian was also published in:  The work in English was published in:

Audiovisual material

 
  
  
 
 
 
 
 
 
 
 
 
 
 
 
 
 

 
Soviet democracy movements
Writing circles
Soviet opposition groups
Persecution of dissidents in the Soviet Union
Underground culture

Era of Stagnation